The Marxist–Leninist Party, USA (MLP) was the final incarnation of a series of communist anti-revisionist groups that began in 1967 lasted until 1993 when it dissolved. It published the paper Workers Advocate. During its history, it became a Hoxhaist group, before turning away from backing Albania and attempting to advance a distinctive anti-revisionist trend in Marxism–Leninism. It was founded as the American Communist Workers Movement (Marxist–Leninist) in the 1960s as a Maoist organization allied with the Canadian Communist Party of Canada (Marxist–Leninist), CPC (M-L).

History 
The group's origins lie in a small, predominantly African American, group founded in early 1967 called Cleveland Draft Resistance Union. In 1968 they reorganized as the Workers Action Committee and broadened their focus from anti-war activities to community organizing, strike support, and the study of Marxism. They embraced Maoism and developed a close relationship with the Canadian Communist Movement (Marxist-Leninist) led by Hardial Bains. In May 1969 the WAC attended a Marxist–Leninist conference in Regina, Canada and established the American Communist Workers' Movement (Marxist-Leninist).  It has "just 100 members."

The ACWM emulated some of the strategy expounded by Communist Party of Canada (Marxist–Leninist) leader Hardial Bains, including attempting to launch a daily newspaper. This experiment - the only Maoist daily ever published in the United States - was the People's America Daily News which lasted for 77 issues.

In about 1973 the group was renamed the Central Organization of US Marxist–Leninists . and militantly opposed the police and fascism, as well as socialists and communists they considered "revisionist". The group continued to move with the CPC (M-L) from Maoism to Hoxhaism  until in 1980 they adopted the name Marxist–Leninist Party USA and split with the Canadian group the following year, with those remaining loyal to the CPC (M-L) becoming the U.S. Marxist-Leninist Organization.

The break with the CPC (M-L) led to the MLP beginning a reassessment of its politics, partially in an attempt to draw other antirevisionists towards it, as many groups claiming anti-revisionism were moving to the right-wing. By the late 1980s the MLP had come to the conclusion that anti-revisionism meant that they had to reject the traditional support of the communist movement's positions from the time of the 1935 Congress of the Comintern onwards. This decision, however, led to an ideological impasse in the MLP, and at its fifth Congress in November 1993 it voted to dissolve itself. A number of activists in the MLP have continued work as the Communist Voice Organization.

See also
 U.S. Marxist-Leninist Organization
 New Communist Movement

References

External links
 The Encyclopedia of anti-Revisionism On-line
 On the roots of the Communist Voice Organization and the Chicago Workers' Voice group: Distortions in a history of the Marxist-Leninist Party, USA by Frank, Seattle. Communist Voice #21, August 15, 1999.
 Reminiscences of the Birth of our Trend by Tim Hall

Defunct Maoist parties in the United States
Defunct communist parties in the United States
Anti-revisionist organizations
Hoxhaist parties in the United States
1967 establishments in the United States
1993 disestablishments in the United States
Political parties established in 1967
Political parties disestablished in 1993